A Thousand Acres is a 1997 American drama film directed by Jocelyn Moorhouse and starring Michelle Pfeiffer, Jessica Lange, Jennifer Jason Leigh and Jason Robards.

It is an adaptation of the Pulitzer Prize-winning novel of the same name by Jane Smiley, which itself is a reworking of William Shakespeare's King Lear. The character of Larry Cook corresponds to the title character of that play, while the characters of Ginny, Rose and Caroline represent Lear's daughters Goneril, Regan and Cordelia. The dramatic catalyst in both works is the division of the father's estate among his three offspring, causing bitter rivalry and ultimately leading to tragedy.

Plot 
Larry Cook, a prosperous farmer in Iowa, decides to retire and split his acres of land among his three daughters, Ginny, Rose and Caroline. Ginny and Rose happily accept the lucrative agreement to live and work on the farm but Caroline abandons farming for a law career in Des Moines and refuses to take part in the deal.

Larry is consumed with rage and rejects Caroline, leaving Rose and Ginny to go about running the farm with their husbands. However, as Larry loses touch with farming life, he begins to lose touch with reality, and his painful descent into senility leaves him bitterly opposed to his daughters' ways of running the farm.

As she struggles to maintain the farm, Ginny encounters a rift in her relationship with Rose, who reveals that Larry had sexually abused her when she was a child, and insists that he had done the same thing to Ginny. The two women also develop a strong extra-marital attachment to Jess, the handsome son of a neighboring farmer who is loyal to Larry.

Paranoid and disillusioned, Larry decides to sue Rose and Ginny in an effort to regain his patriarchal control, and seeks Caroline's help. The lawsuit divides the family forever, leaving Rose and Ginny to suffer alone while realizing painful truths about their childhood. As Rose and Ginny discover their own individual strengths in the face of adversity, they learn how to survive on their own, without the protection of the farm and the suffocating presence of their father.

Cast

Reception
A Thousand Acres holds a rating of 24% on Rotten Tomatoes based on 51 reviews. The website's critical consensus reads "A Thousand Acres makes disappointingly sudsy stuff out of the source material, but benefits from solid performances by a strong cast."

Janet Maslin in The New York Times wrote: "Though Michelle Pfeiffer delivers impressively cold fury as the story's version of Regan (now an embittered breast cancer patient called Rose), and Jessica Lange works hard to breathe life into its Goneril (called Ginny), the film remains stilted and unconvincing... Think obsessive-compulsive Lady Macbeth or Ophelia with an eating disorder, and you have an idea of just how simplistic that seems."

Roger Ebert in The Chicago Sun-Times wrote: "A Thousand Acres is an ungainly, undigested assembly of 'women's issues,' milling about within a half-baked retread of King Lear. The film is so unfocused that at the end of its very long 104 minutes, I was unable to say who I was supposed to like and who I was supposed to hate - although I could name several characters for whom I had no feelings at all... The screenplay is based on a novel by Jane Smiley, unread by me, which won the Pulitzer Prize - which means that either the novel or the prize has been done a great injustice."

Desson Howe wrote in The Washington Post: "That Jane Smiley's A Thousand Acres would become a movie was inevitable. Another virtual certainty was its bowdlerization... Without Smiley’s connecting prose (although we're subjected to long bouts of narration), there’s nothing left but the melodrama... If there are any positives to point to, it would be Lange's performance. Her emotional battle to avoid harsh realities is sure to put her up for those big-time awards. It's too bad she's emoting away in an empty drama that - with all its narrative ellipses - should have been called A Hundred Acres."

Godfrey Cheshire in Variety wrote: "Considering that Moorhouse made one of the best Australian directorial debuts of the last decade with Proof, a small film of great precision and insight, it's a shame that with this film and How to Make an American Quilt she seems to have consigned herself to a world of big-budget, broad-stroke Americana, where her skills are still evident but noticeably diluted. It's likewise regrettable that she's able to make so little use here of Leigh and Robards, who are as good as they can be in thankless roles. Lange and Pfeiffer are well-matched and generally fare better, even though they too are circumscribed by the lackluster writing. The film's standout perf, meanwhile, comes from Keith Carradine, who takes the relatively small role of Ginny's husband and manages to give it a degree of shading and dignity-unto-desperation."

Mick LaSalle in The San Francisco Chronicle wrote: "Imagine it. These great, blond, beautiful acting powerhouses, clashing and bonding and going for the throat. The scenes that could have been written. The movie that might have been made. Too bad, then, that A Thousand Acres, the film version of Jane Smiley's novel of the same name, should turn out to be a soap opera. Don't blame the actors. Their efforts succeed in keeping the bad news from the audience for almost half the picture. Pfeiffer has never been more fierce and committed, and just seeing Leigh and Lange in the same frame is gratifying... It's a picture guaranteed to inspire a kind of schizophrenic reaction in viewers: They'll wish it were better, yet still be glad it was made."

Rita Kempley wrote in The Washington Post: "Jane Smiley's novel A Thousand Acres has been called "King Lear in the cornfields," but the eagerly awaited screen adaptation is but a skeletal litany of miscarriages, mastectomies, sexual abuse, public humiliations and private betrayals. In many ways, it has less in common with Shakespeare's tragedy than with Stephen King's Iowa-set horror story, Children of the Corn... Of course, movie adaptations inevitably entail some simplification, but screenwriter Laura Jones, a New Zealander who also wrote three of Jane Campion's movies, all but exorcises the spirit of the novel. While she uses much of Smiley's dialogue verbatim and includes some of her lovely prose in Jessica Lange's narration, this meditation on the erosion of the family farm and the patriarchy that sustained it has been translated into a feminist screed."

Time Out London wrote: "Jane Smiley's novel earned points for chutzpah, but Jocelyn Moorhouse's adaptation makes heavy weather of this latter-day King Lear. Despite the leisurely Waltons-style voice-over, Larry Cook and his kin don't convince as a Midwestern farming dynasty, while the film itself has only a picturesque sense of the land. It makes for rocky terrain on which to base the ensuing melodramatics."

Awards and nominations
Jessica Lange was nominated for the Golden Globe Award for Best Actress - Motion Picture Drama, losing to Judi Dench for her performance in Mrs. Brown.

See also
 List of William Shakespeare screen adaptations

References

External links
 
 
 

1997 films
1997 drama films
American drama films
1990s English-language films
Films based on American novels
Incest in film
Films based on King Lear
Beacon Pictures films
Films produced by Marc Abraham
Films directed by Jocelyn Moorhouse
Films based on adaptations
Touchstone Pictures films
Films about sisters
Films about child sexual abuse
1990s American films